SM U-17 was a German submarine during World War I. U-17 sank the first British merchant vessel in the First World War, and also sank another ten ships, damaged one ship and captured two ships, surviving the war without casualty.

War service

On , Oberleutnant zur See Johannes Feldkirchener was given command of U-17. On 26 October, U-17 torpedoed the French ferry † in the Strait of Dover. The vessel made port before sinking, with the loss of 40 lives out of over 2,500 on board.

On 2 March 1915 the command of U-17 passed to Kapitänleutnant Hans Walther. The crew escaped on lifeboats while the vessel was scuttled and sunk. Walther's command ended on 9 January 1916 and the next day U-17 joined the Training Flotilla.

Post war
U-17 was decommissioned on 27 January 1919 and sold for scrapping.

Summary of raiding history

References

Notes

Citations

Bibliography

External links
Photo of U-17.
Photos of cruises of German submarine U-54 in 1916-1918. Great photo quality, comments in German.
A 44 min. film from 1917 about a cruise of the German submarine U-35. A German propaganda film without dead or wounded; many details about submarine warfare in World War I.

Room 40:  original documents, photos and maps about World War I German submarine warfare and British Room 40 Intelligence from The National Archives, Kew, Richmond, UK.

Type U 17 submarines
Ships built in Danzig
1912 ships
U-boats commissioned in 1912
World War I submarines of Germany